Events from the year 1702 in the Kingdom of Scotland.

Incumbents 
 Monarch – William II (until 8 March), then Anne 
 Secretary of State – 
 until 6 May: James Ogilvy, 1st Earl of Seafield, jointly with John Carmichael, 1st Earl of Hyndford
 6 May – 21 November: James Ogilvy, 4th Earl of Findlater, jointly with James Douglas, 2nd Duke of Queensberry
 from 21 November: James Douglas, 2nd Duke of Queensberry, jointly with George Mackenzie, 1st Viscount Tarbat

Law officers 
 Lord Advocate – Sir James Stewart
 Solicitor General for Scotland – William Carmichael

Judiciary 
 Lord President of the Court of Session – Lord North Berwick 
 Lord Justice General – Lord Lothian
 Lord Justice Clerk – Lord Pollok, then Lord Prestonhall

Events 
 c. January/February – the Parliament of Scotland refuses to pass an Abjuration Act analogous to the English Security of the Succession, etc. Act 1701.
 8 March – King William II of Scotland (William III of England and Ireland and Stadtholder of the Netherlands) dies in London following complications from a fall from his horse when it stumbles on a molehill and is succeeded by Queen Anne, the last Stuart monarch on the English, Scottish and Irish thrones.
 May – "Women's riot" in Stirling in opposition to military impressment.
 The Advocates Library is moved from the Faculty of Advocates to Parliament House, Edinburgh.
 A General Election is held in autumn that would assemble the last Parliament of Scotland in May, 1703.

Births 
 8 May – Andrew Lauder, Baronet (died 1769)
 18 July – Maria Clementina Sobieska, wife of James Francis Edward Stuart and mother of Charles Edward Stuart (born in Polish Silesia; died 1735 in Rome)
 24 December – John Lindsay, 20th Earl of Crawford, soldier (died of wounds 1749 in London)
Date unknown
 James Douglas, 14th Earl of Morton, astronomer (died 1768 in London)

Deaths 
 8 March – King William II of Scotland (born 1650 in the Netherlands)
Date unknown
 Sir Andrew Agnew, 3rd Baronet, Member of Parliament

See also 
 Timeline of Scottish history

References 

 
Years of the 18th century in Scotland
1700s in Scotland